Jeffrey Lau Kwan Ching (born 15 May 2002) is a Hong Kong professional footballer who plays as a midfielder for Hong Kong Premier League club Resources Capital.

References

External links
 
 Profile at the HKFA

2002 births
Living people
Hong Kong footballers
Association football midfielders
Hong Kong First Division League players
Hong Kong Premier League players
Resources Capital FC players